The Australia Region of Little League Baseball is a region designated for the Little League World Series. The division was founded in 2013 when Little League officially separated Australia from the Asia-Pacific region. This followed a period of explosive growth in youth baseball in the country; the first Little League-affiliated leagues in Australia were only established in 2007, but within five years, nearly 400 Little Leagues were operating, making Australia the largest country outside North America in Little League participation.

In the Little League World Series in 2013, a team from Perth, Western Australia qualified to represent Australia in its debut as a country. The team failed to win any of its three games at the LLWS. A year later another team from Perth would qualify and give the country their first win at the international tournament.

Finals
This table includes championship games contested prior to Australia's automatic berth into the Little League World Series.

* Due to inclement weather, the elimination rounds of the 2017 tournament were moved from Lismore to Sydney.

** Due to the continued impact of the COVID-19 pandemic no international teams traveled to Williamsport in 2021.  Also due to COVID-19-related restrictions in place concurrent with the Australian championship tournament, the Victoria qualifiers were not able to travel to the Australian championship tournament.

By state

LLWS results
As of the 2022 Little League World Series.

{|class="wikitable"
!Year!!Champion!!City!!LLWS!!Record
|-
|||Perth Metro Central LL||Perth||Round 1||0–3
|-
|||Perth Metro North LL||Perth||Round 2||1–2
|-
|||Cronulla LL||Sydney||Round 2||1–2
|-
|||Hills LL||Sydney||Round 3||2–2
|-
|||Hills LL||Sydney||Round 1||1–2
|-
|||Gold Coast LL||Gold Coast||Round 1||0–3
|-
|||Cronulla LL||Sydney||Round 1||0–3
|-
|2020|| align=center colspan=4|Cancelled due to COVID-19 crisis 
|-
||| align=center colspan=4|No participant
|-
|||Brisbane North LL||Brisbane||Round 1||0–2
|}

Results by stateAs of the 2022 Little League World Series.''

See also
Australia Region in other Little League divisions:
Junior League World Series (Australia Region)

References

Aus
Baseball competitions in Australia
Recurring sporting events established in 2013